Tjeerd Borstlap (born January 10, 1955) is a former field hockey player from the Netherlands, who played eight international matches for the Dutch National Men's Team in the years 1978–1979 under coach Wim van Heumen. He played club hockey for the hockey club HC Klein Zwitserland from The Hague.

References
  Dutch Hockey Federation

1955 births
Living people
Dutch male field hockey players
Place of birth missing (living people)
Field hockey players from The Hague
HC Klein Zwitserland players